Elazığ Culture Park is a public park in Elazığ, a city in the Eastern Anatolia region of Turkey. The park is counted as one of the largest parks in the region.

Geography 
The  park is at the eastern part of the center of Elazığ. It is surrounded by City Stadium to the west, Zafran Mesire Alanı to the north, 8th General Directorate of High Ways to the east and, Olgunlar District to the south.

History 
During the early years of the Turkey, the site was used as a city nursery. As the growth of the city of Elazığ step by step site surrounded by the high density residential buildings. At 2010 Municipality of Elazığ took the site and established Elazığ Culture Park   and opened to the public on 29 May 2015, the Conquest Day of İstanbul.

Design 
Designers of Elazığ Culture Park are world known Turkish architect Günay Erdem together with famous Turkish landscape architects Serpil Öztekin Erdem and Sunay Erdem.

References 

Parks in Elazığ
Urban public parks
1943 establishments in Turkey